The 2000–01 season saw Bournemouth compete in the Football League Second Division where they finished in 7th position with 73 points.

Final league table

Results
Bournemouth's score comes first

Legend

Football League First Division

FA Cup

Football League Cup

Football League Trophy

Squad statistics

References

External links
 Bournemouth 2000–01 at Soccerbase.com (select relevant season from dropdown list)

AFC Bournemouth seasons
AFC Bournemouth